Celebrate: The Greatest Hits is a compilation album by Scottish rock band Simple Minds, released on 25 March 2013. There were three different formats released: a single-disc version for the North American market, a two-disc version, and a three-disc version. The album spans all of their studio albums from 1979's Life in a Day to 2009's Graffiti Soul, which at the time was the latest album Simple Minds released, plus the live version "Promised You a Miracle" from 1987's Live in the City of Light, and new tracks recorded for this compilation: "Stagefright", "Blood Diamonds", and "Broken Glass Park". The 1-disc and 2-disc version come in jewel cases.

The 3-disc version comes in a clam shell box which comes with sleeves for each disc (which represent periods in the band's history), a double-sided poster that includes the album's cover art on one side and the cover art for all of the singles included
on this compilation on the other side.

Two-disc version

Disc 1
 "Life in a Day" (4:00) 
 "Chelsea Girl" [Edit] (3:59) 
 "Changeling" [Edit] (3:26) 
 "I Travel" [Edit] (3:06) 
 "Celebrate" [Edit] (2:53) 
 "The American" [Edit] (3:32) 
 "Love Song" [Edit] (3:54) 
 "Promised You a Miracle" [Edit] (3:59) 
 "Glittering Prize" [Edit] (3:58) 
 "Someone Somewhere (In Summertime)" (4:37) 
 "Waterfront" [Edit] (4:38) 
 "Speed Your Love to Me" [Edit] (3:59) 
 "Up on the Catwalk" [Edit] (4:04) 
 "Don't You (Forget About Me)" [Single Version] (4:20)
 "Alive and Kicking" [Edit] (4:45) 
 "Sanctify Yourself" [Edit] (3:55) 
 "All the Things She Said" (4:16) 
 "Ghost Dancing" (4:46)

Disc 2
 "Belfast Child" [Edit] (5:11) 
 "This Is Your Land" [Edit] (4:45) 
 "Kick It In" [Edit] (4:20) 
 "Let There Be Love" [7" Mix] (4:44) 
 "See the Lights" [7" Version Edit] (3:55)
 "Stand by Love" (4:04) 
 "She's a River" [Edit] (4:29) 
 "Hypnotised" [TLA Edit] (4:34) 
 "Glitterball" [Edit] (4:25) 
 "War Babies" [Bascombe Mix Single Version] (4:19) 
 "Space" [Single Version] (5:28) 
 "Cry" (3:55) 
 "Spaceface" (3:52) 
 "Home" (4:22) 
 "Rockets" [Radio Edit] (3:24)
 "Stars Will Lead the Way" (3:26) 
 "Blood Diamonds" (3:55) (new song)
 "Broken Glass Park" (4:09) (new song)

Disc 1 notes
Tracks 1 and 2 are from Life in a Day (1979)
Track 3 is from Real to Real Cacophony (1979)
Tracks 4 and 5 are from Empires and Dance (1980)
Tracks 6 and 7 are from Sons and Fascination/Sister Feelings Call (1981)
Tracks 8-10 are from New Gold Dream (81–82–83–84) (1982)
Tracks 11-13 are from Sparkle in the Rain (1984)
Track 14 is from The Breakfast Club (Original Motion Picture Soundtrack) (1985)
Tracks 15-18 are from Once Upon a Time (1985)

Disc 2 notes
Tracks 1-3 are from Street Fighting Years (1989)
Tracks 4-6 are from Real Life (1991)
Tracks 7 and 8 are from Good News from the Next World (1995)
Tracks 9 and 10 are from Néapolis (1998)
Track 11 is from Our Secrets Are the Same (recorded 1999, released 2004 in Silver Box)
Track 12 and 13 are from Cry (2002)
Track 14 is from Black & White 050505 (2005)
Tracks 15 and 16 are from Graffiti Soul (2009)
Tracks 17 and 18 were promoted as new tracks recorded specifically for this compilation, but were later released on Big Music (2014)

Three-disc version

Disc 1
 "Life in a Day" (4:00) 
 "Chelsea Girl" [Edit] (3:59) 
 "Changeling" [Edit] (3:26) 
 "I Travel" [Edit] (3:09) 
 "Celebrate" [Edit] (2:53) 
 "The American" [Edit] (3:32) 
 "Love Song" [Edit] (3:54) 
 "Sweat in Bullet" [Remix] (3:00)
 "Theme for Great Cities" (5:50)
 "Promised You a Miracle" [Edit] (4:00) 
 "Glittering Prize" [Edit] (3:58) 
 "Someone Somewhere (In Summertime)" (4:38) 
 "New Gold Dream (81,82,83,84)" [Edit] (4:46) 
 "Waterfront" [Single Version] (4:38)
 "Speed Your Love to Me" [Edit] (3:59) 
 "Up on the Catwalk" [Edit] (4:04)

Disc 2
 "Don't You (Forget About Me)" [Single Version] (4:20) 
 "Alive and Kicking" [Edit] (4:45) 
 "Sanctify Yourself" [Edit] (3:55) 
 "All the Things She Said" (4:16) 
 "Ghostdancing" (4:46) 
 "Promised You a Miracle" [Live] (4:54) 
 "Belfast Child" [Edit] (5:11) 
 "Mandela Day" (5:41) 
 "Biko" (7:32) 
 "This Is Your Land" [Edit] (4:48) 
 "Kick It In" [Edit] (4:20) 
 "Let It All Come Down" [Edit] (3:37) 
 "Let There Be Love" [7" Mix] (4:44) 
 "See the Lights" [7" Version Edit] (3:55) 
 "Stand by Love" (4:04) 
 "Real Life" [Edit] (3:54)

Disc 3
 "She's a River" [Edit] (4:29) 
 "Hypnotised" [TLA Edit] (4:34)
 "Glitterball" [Edit] (4:25) 
 "War Babies" [Bascombe Mix Single Version] (4:19)
 "Space" [Single Version] (5:28) 
 "Jeweller to the Stars" [Single Version] (3:34) 
 "Dancing Barefoot" (3:48) 
 "Cry" (3:55) 
 "Spaceface" (3:52) 
 "One Step Closer" (6:06) 
 "Home" (4:22) 
 "Stranger" (4:07) 
 "Stay Visible" (5:17) 
 "Rockets" [Radio Edit] (3:24) 
 "Stars Will Lead the Way" (3:26) 
 "Stagefright" (4:20) (new song)
 "Blood Diamonds" (3:55) (new song)
 "Broken Glass Park" (4:12) (new song)

Disc 1 notes
Tracks 1 and 2 are from Life in a Day (1979)
Track 3 is from Real to Real Cacophony (1979)
Tracks 4 and 5 are from Empires and Dance (1980)
Tracks 6-9 are from Sons and Fascination/Sister Feelings Call (1981)
Tracks 10-13 are from New Gold Dream (81–82–83–84) (1982)
Tracks 14-16 are from Sparkle in the Rain (1984)

Disc 2 notes
Track 1 is from The Breakfast Club (Original Motion Picture Soundtrack) (1985)
Tracks 2-5 are from Once Upon a Time (1985)
Track 6 is from Live in the City of Light (1987)
Tracks 7-12 are from Street Fighting Years (1989)
Tracks 13-16 are from Real Life (1991)

Disc 3 notes
Tracks 1 and 2 are from Good News from the Next World (1995)
Tracks 3 and 4 are from Néapolis (1998)
Tracks 5 and 6 are from Our Secrets Are the Same (recorded 1999, released 2004 on Silver Box)
Track 7 is from Neon Lights
Tracks 8-10 are from Cry (2002)
Tracks 11-13 is from Black & White 050505 (2005)
Tracks 14 and 15 are from Graffiti Soul (2009)
Track 16 was recorded in 2012 and released as a free download. It was going to be on a new album which did not happen, so was included on this compilation instead.
Tracks 17-18 were promoted as new tracks recorded specifically for this compilation, but were later rerecorded for Big Music (2014)

North American version
 "I Travel" [Edit] (3:06) 
 "The American" [Edit] (3:32) 
 "Love Song [Edit] (3:54) 
 "Promised You a Miracle" [Edit] (3:59) 
 "Glittering Prize" [Edit] (3:58) 
 "Someone Somewhere (In Summertime)" (4:37) 
 "Waterfront" [Edit] (4:38) 
 "Speed Your Love to Me" [Edit] (3:59) 
 "Up on the Catwalk" [Edit] (4:04) 
 "Don't You (Forget About Me)" [Single Version] (4:20) 
 "Alive and Kicking" [Edit] (4:45) 
 "Sanctify Yourself" [Edit] (3:55) 
 "All the Things She Said" (4:16) 
 "Belfast Child" [Edit] (5:11) 
 "See the Lights" [7" Version Edit] (3:55) 
 "She's a River" [Edit] (4:29) 
 "Glitterball" [Edit] (4:25) 
 "Blood Diamonds" (3:55) (new song)
 "Broken Glass Park" (4:09) (new song)

Certifications

References 

2013 compilation albums
Simple Minds compilation albums